A referendum on the Contact Group plan was held in Republika Srpska on 28 August 1994, after the National Assembly had rejected the plan on 8 August. The plan would give 49% of Bosnia and Herzegovina to Serbs, around a third less than they held at the time. It was rejected by 97% of voters. Following the referendum, Bosnian Serb President Radovan Karadžić said "We will ask for another map... We expect a new conference, new peace efforts." However, the Contact Group (the United States, Russia, Britain, France and Germany) claimed the referendum was a sham.

Results

References

1994 referendums
1994 in Bosnia and Herzegovina
Referendums in Bosnia and Herzegovina
Referendums in Republika Srpska
Bosnian War
Political history of Republika Srpska
Serbian nationalism in Bosnia and Herzegovina